Helcystogramma furvimaculare is a moth in the family Gelechiidae. It was described by Hou-Hun Li and Hui Zhen in 2011. It is found in Guizhou, China.

The wingspan is about 16 mm. The forewings are yellow, with scattered dark brown scales. The basal third of the costal margin is black, with a small black spot near two-thirds. The hindwings are greyish yellow.

Etymology
The species name refers to the small black spot near the costal two-thirds on the forewings and is derived from Latin prefix furv- (meaning black) and Latin macularis (meaning spotted).

References

Moths described in 2011
furvimaculare
Moths of Asia